Conus submarginatus is a species of sea snail, a marine gastropod mollusk in the family Conidae, the cone snails and their allies. This is a nomen dubium.

Like all species within the genus Conus, these snails are predatory and venomous. They are capable of "stinging" humans, therefore live ones should be handled carefully or not at all.

Description
The size of the shell varies between 20 mm and 45 mm. The narrow shell shows a raised carinate spire. The body whorl is attenuate and closely sulcate in front. Its color is yellowish white. The aperture is rosy.

Distribution
This marine species occurs off New Caledonia

References

  Sowerby, G.B. Jr. (1870). Descriptions of Forty-eight new Species of Shells. Proc. Zool. Soc. Lond. (1870): 249–259
 Tucker J.K. & Tenorio M.J. (2013) Illustrated catalog of the living cone shells. 517 pp. Wellington, Florida: MdM Publishing.

External links
 The Conus Biodiversity website
 

submarginatus
Gastropods described in 1870